From the Big Bang to Tuesday Morning is a Canadian animated short film, directed by Claude Cloutier and released in 2000. The film tells the story of the evolution of life on earth in five minutes, through rapid brush-drawn morph animation reminiscent of aquatint prints.

The film received a Genie Award nomination for Best Animated Short Film at the 21st Genie Awards, and a Jutra Award nomination for Best Animated Short Film at the 3rd Jutra Awards.

References

External links

2000 films
Canadian animated short films
National Film Board of Canada animated short films
Films directed by Claude Cloutier
2000s Canadian films
Animated films without speech